Croissy-sur-Seine (literally Croissy on Seine) is a commune in the Yvelines department in the Île-de-France region in north-central France. It is a suburban town on the western outskirts of Paris. Many expatriates reside in Croissy, given as it is the site of The British School of Paris, one of the top ten private international schools in the world.

Croissy was Russia's base camp for Euro 2016, which ran from June 10 to July 10, 2016.

Geography
Croissy is located on a loop of the river Seine, which forms its eastern, southern, and western boundaries.  Croissy's landward neighbours are Chatou, Le Vésinet, and Le Pecq.
 Area: 
 Average altitude: 26 m

Population

Features
The "centre-ville" provides a reasonable number of shops from bakeries to banks. An active morning market takes place on Fridays and Sundays.

There are several parks, some situated on the islands in the Seine. The commune is home to the 13th century chapel of St Leonard, situated near the banks of the Seine.

The Musée de la Grenouillère brings to life the famous floating café "La Grenouillère" where Claude Monet and Pierre-Auguste Renoir met at the end of the summer of 1869 to paint their first Impressionist paintings. The museum presents a collection of paintings, engravings and objects in a beautiful era atmosphere and organizes exhibitions.

Transport
In good traffic conditions, the centre of Paris is 20 minutes from Croissy; in daily commuting conditions, it can take up to one hour.

Croissy is not directly served by rail transportation since the commune wants to keep the area residential. The nearest RER station is Chatou–Croissy (on the RER A line St Germain branch). The nearest SNCF service is at Bougival.

Education

Public schools in the commune include:

Preschools:
 Écoles maternelle Les Cerisiers
 Écoles maternelle Jean Moulin

Elementary schools:
 École primaire Jules Verne
 École primaire Leclerc

There is one public junior high school, Collège public Jean Moulin.

The British School of Paris, a private school, is in this commune.

Nearby private schools:
 École et collège Sainte-Thérèse (Bougival)
 École primaire Jeanne d'Arc Notre Dame (Chatou)
 Ecole Sainte-Jeanne d'Arc (Le Vésinet)
 Le Bon Sauveur (Le Vésinet) - preschool through senior high school/sixth form college

Personalities related to Croissy-sur-Seine

 Jérôme Alonzo (° 1972), footballer, when he played at Paris-Saint-Germain.
 Émile Augier (1820-1889), playwright, academician, died there.
 Daniel Authouart (° 1943), painter.
 Pierre Balmain (1914-1982), couturier.
 Paul Barras (1755-1829), conventional, member of the Executive Board.
 Josephine de Beauharnais (1763-1814), Empress of the French.
 Mathurin Jacques Brisson (1723–1806), zoologist, died in Croissy-sur-Seine.
 Jean Chanorier (1746-1806), receiver-general of finances, first mayor of Croissy in 1790, died there.
 Christian Corrêa Dionisio (° 1975), footballer, when he played at Paris-Saint-Germain.
 Anna Dartaux (1844-1887), dancer and singer, died there.
 Paul Déroulède (1846-1914), writer, politician.
 Michel Delpech (1946-2016), singer.
 Monna Delza (1882-1921), actress.
 Amélie Diéterle (1871-1941), actress.
 Louis Ganderax (1855-1941), writer, literary critic, died there.
 Ernest Goüin (1815-1885), industrialist.
 Roger Henrard (1900-1975), aerial photographer, died there.
 Jean-Michel Jarre (° 1948), composer.
 Adolphe Kégresse (1879-1943), an engineer, died there.
 Eugène Labiche (1815-1888), playwright.
 Max Lazard (1875-1953), economist and sociologist was born there.
 Pierre-Jean Mariette (1694-1794), engraver and librarian in Paris, famous art historian.
 Claude Monet (1840-1926), impressionist painter.
 Roger Pierre (1923-2010), comedian and actor.
 Anne-Marie Peysson (1935-2015), announcer, host, singer.
 Charlotte Rampling (° 1946), actress.
 Auguste Renoir (1841-1919), impressionist painter.
 Théophile Poilpot (1848-1915), academic painter.
 Albert Robida (1848-1926), illustrator, caricaturist and journalist, is buried there.
 Camille Robida (1880-1938), architect, son of the previous, is buried in a vault designed by himself.
 Claudia Victrix (1888-1976), singer and film actress.
 Raí Souza Vieira de Oliveira (° 1965), footballer, when he played at Paris-Saint-Germain.

See also
Communes of the Yvelines department
Geneva, Illinois USA - Sister City

References

External links

 Croissy-sur-Seine city council website 

Communes of Yvelines